Filippo Del Giudice, (26 March 1892 – 1 January 1963), born in Trani, Italy, was an Italian film producer. Giudice was a lawyer, legal advisor and film producer. He worked with people that were already well known in their field of work.

Life
Giudice fled from Italy to England in December 1932 because he would have been politically imprisoned. He was also a lawyer in Italy. Reoccurring anti-Semitic legislation would have caused him more problems if he stayed in Italy, and his film production company Two Cities was later not allowed to film in Italy because it was believed that his board was operated by Jewish people. Giudice did not know English and taught himself, poorly according to himself, while teaching lessons to the children of Italian waiters in Soho.

In 1937, he founded the company Two Cities with Mario Zampi and was the legal advisor, later becoming a film producer. After the releases of a 1939 film based on a play by Terence Rattigan titled French Without Tears and the 1940 anti-Nazi film Freedom Radio, Giudice and Zamp were interned in 1940 as "enemy aliens". He was later released from internment to work on the 1943 film In Which We Serve which was written by playwright Noël Coward. MI5 supplied Ann Elwell as his secretary. She was translating for him as he took on the role of Art Director and she also did some scriptwriting. Giudice produced the 1944 film Mr. Emmanuel which is the only World War II film with a Jewish subject.

Despite being a producer, Giudice stated that he knew nothing about filmmaking. Giudice also considered himself to be an "administrator of talents" instead of a producer. His films included directors, writers or actors that were already well known in their field. Film directors that he collaborated with included Anthony Asquith, David Lean, Carol Reed and Laurence Olivier. Giudice was an administrator for Pilgrim Pictures on the 1948 film The Guinea Pig and the 1949 film Private Angelo.

In 1950, Giudice moved back to Italy and never produced another film. In 1962, he died on New Year's Eve in Florence.

Production filmography
French Without Tears (1939)
First Of The Few (1942)
In Which We Serve (1942)
This Happy Breed (1944)
Mr. Emmanuel (1944)
Henry V (1944) 
The Way to the Stars (1945)
Men of Two Worlds (1946)
Odd Man Out (1947)
Hamlet (1948)

References

External links

1892 births
Italian film producers
British film producers
1962 deaths
Italian emigrants to the United Kingdom